Louis Jäggi (17 November 1948 – 2006) was a Swiss cross-country skier. He competed in the men's 50 kilometre event at the 1972 Winter Olympics.

References

External links
 

1948 births
2006 deaths
Swiss male cross-country skiers
Olympic cross-country skiers of Switzerland
Cross-country skiers at the 1972 Winter Olympics
Place of birth missing